Prince Mbilini, otherwise known as Mbilini waMswati, was a Swazi prince and son of Mswati II. Mbilini was a pretender to the Swazi throne after the death of King Mswati II. His brother Mbandzeni was the recognised king after the death of their half brother crown prince Ludvonga. As a result of this, Mbilini was exiled to the south, outside the border of Swaziland, in Zululand. Mbilini was an accomplished military commander and he waged raid on the communities near the southern border of Swaziland. Most notably, he defeated the British army in the battle of Intombe, during the Anglo-Zulu War.

Footnotes

References

 

Swazi royalty
Sons of kings